Attorney General Singh may refer to:

Vijay R. Singh (1931–2006), KBE (1931–2006) Attorney General of Fiji
Anand Singh (Fijian politician) (born 1948), Attorney General of Fiji
Doodnauth Singh (1933–2013), Attorney General of Guyana

See also
General Singh (disambiguation)